The Secret House is a 1917 thriller novel by the British writer Edgar Wallace. It featured the return of several characters who had appeared in his earlier work The Nine Bears.

References

Bibliography
 Clark, Neil. Stranger than Fiction: The Life of Edgar Wallace, the Man Who Created King Kong. Stroud, UK: The History Press, 2015.

1917 British novels
Novels by Edgar Wallace
British thriller novels